Michel Duboullay or Du Boullay (1676 in Paris – 1751 in Rome) was a French librettist..

Secretary of the Grand Prieur de Vendôme, Duboullay authored the librettos of two operas:
 
 Zéphyre et Flore, opera-ballet in three acts and a prologue, music by Louis Lully and Jean-Louis Lully, played 22 March 1688 and revived in theatre by the Académie royale de musique Tuesday 18 June 1715 (Paris, P. Ribou) 
 Orphée, three-act tragedy, music by Louis Lully, presented in 1690.

Sources 
 Jacques Bernard Durey de Noinville, Louis Travenol, Histoire du Théâtre de l’opéra en France depuis l’établissement de l’Académie, Paris, Joseph Barbou, 1753, (p. 191).

External links 
 Michel Duboullay on data.bnf.fr
 His plays and their presentations on CÉSAR

18th-century French dramatists and playwrights
French opera librettists
Writers from Paris
1676 births
1751 deaths